WLNN-CD, virtual and UHF digital channel 24, branded on-air as the Mountain Television Network and MTN 18, was a low-powered, Class A television station licensed to Boone, North Carolina, United States. The station was owned by the Carolina Rays. On cable, the station was seen on channel 18, 15, 16, and 7 throughout Western North Carolina and Eastern Tennessee.

History

1990s

It was an independent station with some national programming from Youtoo America. The station was originally owned by Tim Baxter and Bob Flanagan, who did an excellent job starting the station in the early 1990s and providing local news and show content to the viewers in the High Country.

2000s

After many years of excellent public service to the local communities, it had become increasingly difficult to financially operate a local television station, and so they sold MTN in 2003 to Steve Rondinaro.

Rondinaro had many years of broadcast experience as a news anchor, and he had previously owned a group of successful radio stations in the Boone area.  Prior to moving to the Boone area, Rondinaro had been a very successful evening news anchor in Miami, Florida.

Rondinaro sold his group of high country radio stations and used these proceeds to purchase MTN in the Fall of 2003.

As the television industry changed because of the introduction of cable and satellite networks, resulting in more television stations becoming available to viewers through cable and satellite providers, then local stations such as MTN faced increasing competition for viewers and advertisers.

As a result, it became more and more difficult for MTN to survive financially.  MTN was losing money every month, and Rondinaro was forced to spend his own money every month to keep the station going.

Eventually, he put the station up for sale in 2007.  However, with no buyers coming forward throughout 2007 and 2008, and Rondinaro no longer in Boone because of the news anchor position he had taken at WWAY on the East Coast of North Carolina, then MTN was on the brink of closure for two years.

Then, just when it appeared that MTN would close, a buyer, Terry Smith, came in at the last minute, and Rondinaro sold WLNN to Terry Smith in 2008.

Smith had grown up in the local area before going on to play and coach professional football and baseball, while also previously serving as a teacher and head coach in area schools.  Smith's motivation was to lead with programming and create a television station that provided coverage of everything that was taking place in Western North Carolina.

In addition, his overriding rule in providing this all-inclusive coverage was that MTN would only broadcast positive television shows and positive news coverage.  Unlike other stations across the country that usually focus on negative news stories, Smith focused MTN entirely on everything positive and great that was happening in the High Country of Western North Carolina.

With this never-ending goal in mind, MTN worked 7 days per week, 24 hours per day, and literally 365 days per year in an effort to cover everything positive that was happening in the region.

As a result, MTN produced more hours of its own television content during these years than any other television station in the United States.

MTN produced, filmed, directed, hosted, and broadcast more than 100 hours each week of its own programming, including its own Appalachian State University football and basketball game broadcasts, additional college football and basketball game broadcasts, more than 500 high school football, basketball, soccer, baseball, and softball game broadcasts for high schools in the counties of Watauga, Avery, Ashe, Wilkes, Carter, Johnson, Mitchell, Yancey, Madison, and throughout Western North Carolina and Eastern Tennessee, the EndZone football Friday night highlight show, the Appalachian State University ASU Chalktalk football strategy show, nightly newscasts, morning newscasts, a noon show and newscasts, a three-hour live morning show with many guests each day from throughout the High Country, a weekly sports highlight show that included coverage of the High Country Heisman contenders, a weekly Appalachian State University sports highlight show, the Avery County Chamber of Commerce Show, the Watauga County Chamber of Commerce Show, the Avery County Schools Show, the Watauga County Schools Show, the Appalachian State University chancellor's show, the Ashe County Arts Show, the Watauga County Arts Show, the Good Life of Avery County Show, the Wilkes County Show, the two hour daily live sports call-in show, the These Historic Hills show, live broadcasts of political elections, interviews each election period with all the political candidates running for office, regular interviews with all area state and national in-office congress people and senators, the weekly Seniors of the Month show which highlighted the lives of outstanding citizens who were of senior age in the MTN broadcast area, many hours every week of local affairs programming, and the weekly Veterans’ Voice two hour television show that interviewed and told the life stories of more than 150 World War II veterans, Korean War veterans, Vietnam War veterans, and Gulf War veterans.

MTN filmed, produced, and broadcast an average of ten high school and college sports game broadcasts each week throughout the year, utilizing three excellent production teams of camera people and experienced game announcers.

The MTN Games of the Week were announced by the outstanding Len Murphy on play-by-play and Terry Smith as the color analyst. Forming a tremendous partnership for many years, Murphy and Smith became synonymous with all of western North Carolina's best and most-watched sports broadcasts.

MTN also filmed, produced, and directed national television programs such as the “Southern Fresh” cooking show that MTN filmed and produced, with Terry Smith directing.  Southern Fresh was broadcast on several national cable television networks such as RFD-TV, reaching more than 100 million potential viewers every week.

MTN also filmed a stage production of the world-famous “Horn in the West” outdoor drama that is historically based on the Revolutionary War and on Daniel Boone.  Horn in the West has been performed in Boone, North Carolina since 1952.  From this filming, and with Terry Smith directing, MTN produced a Horn in the West movie and DVD that was distributed to a nationwide audience.

The television program that MTN is most proud of, and which is the most important and most valuable television show that MTN has ever produced and broadcast, was the Veterans’ Voice television show because the Veterans’ Voice program allowed MTN to interview and tell the life stories of more than 150 World War II veterans, as well as interview and tell the life stories of many Korean War veterans, Vietnam War veterans, and Gulf War veterans.

The Veterans’ Voice Show was hosted by Terry Smith and by World War II veteran and American hero Ken Wiley.  The entire focus of the Veterans’ Voice programs was to honor and show our great respect and appreciation to our World War II “America’s Greatest Generation” war heroes, as well as our Korean War, Vietnam War, and Gulf War veteran heroes.

Ken served America with great honor during World War II.  He is a veteran of seven D-Day invasions in the Pacific Ocean during World War II, where as a coxman he drove a LCVP landing craft full of soldiers onto the beaches of these seven D- Day invasions.  Ken, whose four brothers also fought in the war, is also a renowned author who wrote ten highly acclaimed books about World War II, including books that focused on the crucial importance of America pulling together as a country to provide the nationwide “All For One and One For All” environment that was necessary for America's success in the war.

Every Veterans’ Voice show was blessed with having a local war veteran and hero as a special guest. Terry Smith and Ken Wiley interviewed each veteran throughout every show.  The two-hour length of the show allowed the very comprehensive interviews to tell the complete life stories of the veterans from when they were young and growing up as a child with their families in the local region, through their incredible war experiences during the war, and on to their post-war careers and present day lives with their families.

Each veteran's life story was broadcast on MTN throughout a six-state region, and a DVD copy was also given to every family member of each veteran, including a DVD copy given to every son, daughter, wife, brother, sister, grandson, and granddaughter, so that all family members would forever have a permanent copy of their loved one's war experiences and life story.

The Veteran's Voice television show was filmed and broadcast by MTN for eight years, producing more than 150 life stories of our American war heroes.  As the show progressed throughout its eight years, the show also brought in additional World War II veterans to serve with Ken and Terry as co-hosts for specific programs, including outstanding World War II heroes HC Moretz, Norman Isenhour, and Sam Wotherspoon.

As a result of this total commitment to tell the life stories of our World War II veterans, MTN, Ken, and Terry created the largest and greatest compilation of World War II veteran history and life stories in the world.  The benefits of this work for America and for the world will last forever, and copies of all 150 World War II Veterans’ Voice shows are now kept in national museums throughout the United States, as well as being kept in local and regional libraries throughout Western North Carolina and Eastern Tennessee.

In addition, a second set of Veterans’ Voice shows were made that were hosted by Keith Buchanan and Terry Smith.  Buchanan is a renowned World War II historian who leads historical tours to World War II battlefields throughout Europe.  This set of Veterans’ Voice shows told the in-depth stories and details of famous World War II battles, and also told the amazing stories of specific World War II veterans who became American heroes.

MTN, Ken Wiley, Terry Smith, and Keith Buchanan also worked together to organize and host two World War II Symposiums, one symposium at Appalachian State University and a second symposium at Watauga High School, in order to recognize and show respect for all our area World War II American heroes, and to provide first person World War II history to citizens throughout our region.

Both symposiums recognized and honored all the World War II veterans in our region, and each veteran was an VIP at the symposiums as they were all introduced on stage to the audience, and each veteran had his or her own table for them to meet and sign autographs for symposium attendees.

Ken Wiley, HC Moretz, Dorian Moretz, and Terry Smith also worked together to bring World War II history to schools throughout Western North Carolina and Eastern Tennessee, during which Ken and HC spoke to students in school assemblies and classrooms throughout the region, thereby providing first-person historical knowledge of World War II to our young people.

In summary, Terry Smith's goal of MTN leading with content, along with the dedicated work of MTN on a 365-day per year basis, resulted in MTN producing more hours of television content than any other television station in the United States.

When Smith purchased MTN, the station had been broadcasting on only one cable network, and in only two counties.  However, after his purchase of MTN, Smith worked very hard to build broadcast partnerships with numerous cable networks throughout the Southeast Region of the United States in order to expand MTN's broadcast reach.  Through this relentless work, he was able to build MTN into a television station that broadcast to more than 1 million viewers on 16 cable networks in six states, including North Carolina, Tennessee, Virginia, South Carolina, Georgia, and Florida.

MTN could also be seen on its over the air broadcast signal that reached a very wide broadcast area in North Carolina, Tennessee, and Virginia, and on WTBL-CD in Lenoir.  These over the air and second station broadcasts, along with the 16 cable networks that MTN broadcast on, allowed MTN to reach a total of two million viewers in six states.

2010s Ending

As the television industry moved from being broadcast on an analog over the air signal to a digital broadcast signal, the FCC decided to benefit citizens by selling some of its television airwave frequencies to wireless telephone carriers in order to free up frequencies that would increase and improve nationwide cell phone and wi-fi capabilities. The FCC decided to hold an FCC Spectrum auction.

These broadcast signals were given values of importance based upon two primary factors the station's over the air broadcast signal reached, and how much interference each station's broadcast signal caused to other stations’ broadcast signals in the surrounding region.

During Terry Smith's tenure at MTN, he had worked hard to create an MTN broadcast signal that increased its broadcast reach to the greatest number of people possible throughout a several state area, and had worked to extend the MTN signal as far and with as much strength as possible into other broadcast signal areas. This resulted in MTN's broadcast signal becoming more valuable than nearly any comparably-sized television station in America, and as the 208 rounds and 4 stages of the FCC Incentive Auction unfolded over a two-year period, the MTN broadcast signal continued to be a necessary part of the FCC's wireless auction plan.

Even though very few television stations in America remained at the end of the auction after 4 stages and 208 auction rounds, MTN was still needed as one of the auction's essential components, and the FCC chose to take the WLNN-CD frequency as part of the Spectrum auction. On November 30, 2017, the station closed. The station's license was cancelled by the FCC on November 12, 2018.

See also
Channel 18 branded TV stations in the United States
Channel 24 low-power TV stations in the United States

References

External links
 
 MTN 18 News on Facebook

Television channels and stations established in 1989
1989 establishments in North Carolina
Television channels and stations disestablished in 2018
2018 disestablishments in North Carolina
Defunct television stations in the United States
LNN-LP
Low-power television stations in the United States
LNN-LP